A by-election was held for the Australian House of Representatives seat of Batman in Victoria (Australia) on 1 September 1962. It was triggered by the death of Labor MP Alan Bird.

The by-election was won by Labor candidate Sam Benson. The governing Liberal Party did not nominate a candidate, leaving the Liberal Forum, formed in opposition to Australian involvement in the Vietnam War and one of the earliest precursors to the Australia Party (itself a predecessor of the Australian Democrats), to take second place.

Results

References

1962 elections in Australia
Victorian federal by-elections
1960s in Victoria (Australia)
September 1962 events in Australia